The M10 Road is a Road in Zambia. It goes from Livingstone, through Sesheke, to Mongu. The Road is approximately 508 kilometres and follows the Zambezi River for its entire length.

The M10 between Livingstone and Kazungula (where there is a narrow border to Botswana) and extending further west to Sesheke (where there is a border  to Namibia's Caprivi Strip) is a major route used by motorists for international trade and travelling between Zambian cities and the respective countries of Botswana, Namibia and South Africa. The road is one lane in each direction. As a result, the road may be very busy and may have high volumes of traffic in either direction.

The M10 between Livingstone and Sesheke (Katima Mulilo) is part of the Walvis Bay-Ndola-Lubumbashi Development Road.

Route
The M10 Route begins in Livingstone (just south of the town centre), at an intersection with the T1 Road (Lusaka-Livingstone Road; with access to Victoria Falls and north-western Zimbabwe in the south and northern, central and eastern Zambia in the north-east).

The road goes west, being the road separating the Dambwa North and Dambwa Central suburbs of Livingstone. The road goes for 70 kilometres, though the north-western section of the Mosi-oa-Tunya National Park, to the small town of Kazungula, where there is a narrow border with Botswana on the Zambezi River (Currently crossed using the Kazungula Bridge; previously by the Kazungula Ferry) (The tiny stretch of road from the M10 to the Kazungula Bridge is known as the M19 Road on Zambia's network and the road on the other side of the Border is known as the A33 road of Botswana).

Most global positioning systems suggest that the route through Kazungula and Eastern Botswana is a quicker route to Johannesburg, South Africa from Livingstone than through Victoria Falls and Zimbabwe. The M10 Road is also on the main route between Botswana and Lusaka (Zambia's capital city) and countries like DR Congo and Malawi. As a result, the route is important for international trade and may be busy in either direction.

From the small town of Kazungula, the M10 Road continues west for 135 kilometres, crossing into the Western Province, bypassing the town of Mwandi, to the town of Sesheke. Just before Mwandi, by Simungoma Market (40 kilometres before Sesheke), is a junction with the D787, which goes north to the town of Mulobezi (95 kilometres away), where there is a timber industry.

The M10 is the main road through Sesheke Central. 3 kilometres west of Sesheke, at a junction with the RD325 Road, at the point where the Zambezi River stops being a national borderline and turns northwards, the M10 Road crosses in a south-westerly direction as the Katima Mulilo Bridge (completed In 2004) to be on the western side of the Zambezi River, before meeting the Namibia (Katima Mulilo) Border Post.

Just after crossing the Zambezi River, there is a road south into Namibia's Caprivi Strip, connecting to Namibia's B8 road (part of the Walvis Bay-Ndola-Lubumbashi Development Road). The Katima Mulilo Bridge (completed in 2004), connecting Sesheke with the western side of the Zambezi River, completes a much-needed road link between Zambia and Namibia.
As the main link between cities in Namibia like Walvis Bay and cities in Malawi, DR Congo, Tanzania and Zambia, the road is important for international trade and may be used frequently by motorists in either direction.

The M10 between Kazungula and Sesheke is a road in a very poor condition, with many motorists choosing to use different routes between Kazungula and Namibia (like commuting through Kasane and the northern area of the Chobe National Park, both in Botswana, to enter Namibia at Ngoma).

From the Namibia Border, the M10 turns to the north-north-west and heads for 116 km to a point south of the town of Sioma. Just before Sioma is the Ngonye Falls, also known as the Sioma Falls, on the Zambezi River. The M10 Road crosses back to the eastern side of the Zambezi River as the Sioma Bridge and continues north for 85 kilometres to the town of Senanga, which is near the southern point of the Barotse Floodplain. It passes through the eastern suburbs.

From Senanga, the M10 Road goes north for 100 km, through the Lui Toll Plaza, to the town of Mongu, which is the capital of the Western Province and Barotseland. The M10 ends at an intersection with the M9 Road from Lusaka at a roundabout in Mongu Central (adjacent to Barotse Shopping Mall).

M19 Road (Zambia) 
On Zambia's road network, the M19 is designated as the short 3-kilometre road through Kazungula, from the junction with the M10 southwards to the Kazungula Bridge on the Zambezi River, where it crosses the river into the nation of Botswana. It becomes the A33 road of Botswana to Kasane and Nata on the other side of the river. The border area on the other side of the river crossing is also named Kazungula.

See also 
Roads in Zambia

References

Roads in Zambia
Southern Province, Zambia
Western Province, Zambia